Tantuni is a spicy dish consisting of julienne cut beef or sometimes lamb stir-fried on a sac with a hint of cotton oil. It is a specialty of Mersin in Turkey.

The meat in tantuni is first crushed and boiled in salted water, then fried in cotton oil. Afterwards meat is wrapped with lavash bread together with chopped onions, chopped, preferably skinless tomato slices, green peppers and parsley. The resulting mass is seasoned with pepper, salt and possibly other spices, and served wrapped in lavash bread.

Popular Culture
With the recent trend in fast-food, Tantuni has become a healthier and more traditional alternative to other similar foods such as hamburger and pizza. It's usually served with ayran and pickled pepper.

References

See also
 Turkish cuisine

Turkish sandwiches
Beef sandwiches
Spicy foods
Street food in Turkey